The headline is the text at the top of a newspaper article, indicating the nature of the article below it.

Headlines (plural) may also refer to:
 "Headlines" (Alcazar song), a 2010 song by Alcazar
 "Headlines" (Drake song), a 2011 song by Drake
 "Headlines (Friendship Never Ends)", a 2007 song by the Spice Girls
 "Headlines" (Jay Leno), a weekly comedy segment performed on The Jay Leno Show
 Headlines (Flash and the Pan album), 1982
 Headlines (Neon Blonde album), 2005
 Headlines (Midnight Star album)
 Headlines!, a 2010 EP by The Saturdays
 Headlines Today, Indian news and information television channel
 Headlines and Deadlines: The Hits of a-ha, an album by A-ha
 Headlines (2001 film), a 2001 Hong Kong comedy-drama film
 Headlines (1925 film), a 1925 silent film

Headline (singular) may also refer to:
 Headline (film), a 1944 British thriller film
 Headline Publishing Group, a British publishing company
 Headline (company), a venture capital company
 Headline Chasers, a game show
 Headline Daily, a free Chinese newspaper
 Headline News, a cable television network
 Headline inflation, an economics term